Otiocerinae is a subfamily of derbid planthoppers in the family Derbidae. There are about 7 genera and more than 90 described species in Otiocerinae.

Genera
These seven genera belong to the subfamily Otiocerinae:
 Anotia Kirby, 1821
 Apache Kirkaldy, 1901
 Otiocerus Kirby, 1821
 Patara Westwood, 1840
 Sayiana Ball, 1928
 Shellenius Ball, 1928
 Sikaiana Distant, 1907

References

Further reading

External links

 

 
Derbidae